Cubazomus is a genus of hubbardiid short-tailed whipscorpions, first described by Reddell & Cokendolpher in 1995.

Species 
, the World Schizomida Catalog accepts the following two species:

 Cubazomus armasi (Rowland & Reddell, 1981) – Cuba
 Cubazomus montanus Teruel, 2004 – Cuba

References 

Schizomida genera